is a player character from the Tekken fighting game franchise by Namco Bandai Games, and has been a mainstay in the series since his debut in Tekken 3 (1997). A power-hungry kickboxer, Bryan was once an Interpol officer until he was killed in a shootout. He was revived by the mad scientist Dr. Abel through the use of cybernetics.

Appearances

In video games
Formerly an officer in the International Police Organization, Bryan was killed during a shootout in Hong Kong one day. His corpse was transported to the laboratory of a mad scientist named Dr. Abel in his attempt to complete his project of forming a cyborg army. Abel thought that a perfect cyborg must have the mechanics built by his rival Bosconovitch, so he reanimated Fury's body and sent him to collect data on similar plans by his rival, Dr. Bosconovitch. Bryan enters the King of Iron Fist Tournament 3, targeting Yoshimitsu, who has strong ties with Bosconovitch, but Bryan was defeated by Yoshimitsu in the later stages of the tournament.

In Tekken 4, Abel abandons Bryan when Heihachi Mishima and the Mishima Zaibatsu corporation recruits him as its top scientific advisor. This sends Bryan into a murderous rage, and he enters the King of Iron Fist Tournament 4, feeling victory will force Abel to change his body, thus becoming the most incredible being in existence once again. This does not happen, and after his loss, Bryan instead uses his last ounce of strength to knock Abel out before losing consciousness and left him to die in the burning laboratory. Yoshimitsu brings him to Dr. Bosconovitch, who promises to transfer Bryan's mind into a new body, although it will take a whole year.

In Tekken 5, however, Bryan awakens a month later. Bosconovitch tells Bryan that his body was too complex to work with, but as a last resort, he had installed a perpetual power generator in him as an emergency measure. Upon learning this, Bryan attacks Bosconovitch and the Manji clan members assigned to guard the doctor, and leaves the laboratory. Bryan enters the King of Iron Fist Tournament 5 to test his performance with the generator installed, unaware that Yoshimitsu is pursuing him for revenge. Yoshimitsu's repeated meddling hinders Bryan's hopes of unlocking the generator's true powers in the King of Iron Fist Tournament 5. Soon afterwards, Yoshimitsu defeats Bryan and his frustration reaches its pinnacle, and he begins to destroy everything in sight after leaving the tournament. Driven by rage, he ventures to various battlefields around the world, indiscriminately leveling everything in his way into rubble. However, he soon grows tired of the same thing repeating itself countless times. Around this time, he catches wind of the King of Iron Fist Tournament 6. Hungry for more capable prey, Bryan headed for the tournament to prove his mettle. Bryan also appears in Tekken 7, being one of the 18 characters available in the first location tests of the game.

Bryan also appears in Tekken Card Challenge, Tekken Tag Tournament, Tekken 3D: Prime Edition, Tekken Tag Tournament 2, and Tekken Revolution. Bryan appears in Capcom-made crossover fighting game Street Fighter X Tekken as a DLC character with Jack-X as his official tag partner. His Swap Costume is modeled after Urien. According to the download blurb, with his powers and abilities being recognized by Urien, the second in command of a mysterious organization, Bryan is brought into their ranks. Additionally, M. Bison's Swap Costume is modeled after Bryan's appearance.

Design and gameplay
Bryan is depicted as a muscular man with gray hair in his early 30s. He has two tribal tattoos on his neck and wears a trademark red armband on his left arm. Many scars are apparent around his body, including a vertical one on his face, a large cross-shaped one on his back, and a long vertical one on his torso. Once a police detective before becoming a cyber-zombie, Bryan wears numerous outfits with military or police motifs, plus gray camouflage pants, black combat boots, gloves, and knee pads. In his first appearance (Tekken 3 and TTT), he wears a black vest with white letters on the back that read "A.T–O"; their meaning is unknown.

In Tekken 4, Bryan wears an unbuttoned green military-style jacket, blue trousers with a belt of bullets on his right leg, and a small pocket knife beneath. In Tekken 5 and onwards, he does not wear the green jacket. Now more bullet magazines with shotgun shells in them are tied around his waist and left leg, and small grenades are tied around his lower left leg. He also gains brass knuckles with spikes on them. His Player 2 costume usually consists of snake leather pants, a black T-shirt, and black shoes and gloves. Bryan has worn his characteristic snakeskin pants with gloves throughout the Tekken series.

In Tekken 7 (starting from Fated Retribution arcade title update), Bryan dons his Tekken 4 green jacket once again, with the trouser color scheme now in gray camouflage, except some body parts' sides are torn and show cyborg body parts underneath the skin on his left arm and right leg. Despite both the left arm and right leg outfit parts torn up, Bryan's glove on the left side, and kneepad and boots on the right side remained intact. Additionally, Bryan wears a black bandanna mask with a half-fanged skeletal mouth and tongue design.

Bryan is an unorthodox kickboxer who heavily relies on a ferocious punishment game. He can do heavy amounts of damage with his counter-hits, making sure no move goes unpunished. He also has pressuring capabilities, keeping opponents on tilt. Bryan is well known for his "Fisherman Slam", a move in which he lifts his opponent by punching his or her chest and slams him or her into the ground, while delivering his evil laugh. He will laugh whenever specific moves (e.g. Jack's "Volcano Blaster" and Nina's "Bad Habit") are performed on him.

Bryan however is relatively unsafe and has a limited range of moves, so risks must be taken to be rewarded with combos near 30% damage. He is the only character whose ten-hit strings exclude low attacks. In all, he is a consistently powerful character with a toolset for intimidating his opponents. Bryan fights using violent kickboxing techniques as he used to rely on "eight science of limbs" for most of his movesets such as the combination of punches, kicks, elbows and knees for striking as seen on one of his single win poses.

In other media
Bryan appears in three Tekken comics, Tekken Saga (1997), Tekken: Tatakai no Kanatani (2000) and Tekken Forever (2003). In the 2009 live action movie Tekken, Bryan is portrayed by Gary Daniels. He is depicted as a man who has had cybernetic upgrades. He is blackmailed by Kazuya Mishima into killing Jin Kazama to keep his cybernetic upgrades a secret. After Kazuya changes the rules of the tournament making it so that the competitors are forced to kill each other in order to win, Bryan is pitted against Sergei Dragunov, whom he kills with a spiked chain during their fight. He later fights Jin Kazama and although he has the upper hand through most of the fight, Jin flashes back to Jun Kazama's training and follows her advice by exploiting Bryan's weak spots. Bryan is defeated and killed by Jin. Prior to his death, Bryan held the title as the 'current' King of Iron Fist Tournament. Bryan appears in the prequel, Tekken 2: Kazuya's Revenge, with Daniels reprising his role. A dossier on Bryan is briefly seen in the CGI film Tekken: Blood Vengeance when Anna Williams opens a file containing dossiers on various persons of interest.

Reception
Upon Bryan Fury's debut in Tekken 3, Next Generation called him "easily the scariest looking of the new batch". In 2012, Cheat Code Central ranked Bryan as the sixth "baddest video game fighter", commenting: "On paper, Bryan Fury is a kickboxer; in practice, Bryan Fury is insane. He's a cop, he's a zombie, and he's ready to tear your face off if you look at him funny." In 2013, Complex ranked Bryan as the fourteenth-best Tekken character, commenting: "It starts with the laugh – that insane, cackling laugh that he belts out at the beginning of his matches. For a zombie, Bryan sure is lively, not to mention crazy."  4thletter placed Bryan's Tekken 5 (alongside Tekken Tag Tournament 2) ending at 24th place in their list of top 200 fighting game endings.  In GamesRadar article for Street Fighter X Tekken, they stated: "Sometimes searching for a way to extend his artificial life ala the villains in Blade Runner, other times simply entering the tournaments to test his powers, Bryan is one of the tougher customers in the Tekken series." PlayStation Universe included Bryan Fury and Yoshimitsu among the top five rival pairs in Tekken Tag Tournament 2, commenting "Bryan is your heavy hitter, with his meaty kicks and punches delivering some health-zapping blows, while Yoshimitsu can confuse and abuse his victims with some intricate juggles and mix-up combos." Peter Austin from WhatCulture named Bryan the "2nd Greatest Tekken Character of All Time". Bryan was ranked by Den of Geek as the "7th best Tekken character", with comments "Someone at Namco realized that Roy Batty from Blade Runner would make for a good fighting game character and God bless them because they were right. Bryan Fury is giving us a ridiculous undead cyborg of a man who wants to smash your jaw off as he laughs maniacally." Paste ranked Bryan as the "16th Best Tekken Character", commenting "Fury now wanders the world looking for a fight worthy of his talents, killing anyone brave enough to get in his way with his powerful cybernetic body and kickboxing martial arts style." In an official fan poll by Namco, Bryan ranked as the tenth-most requested Tekken character to be playable in Tekken X Street Fighter, at 9.72% of votes.

See also
List of Tekken characters

References

External links
Official profile at Tekken.com

Action film characters
Cyborg characters in video games
Fictional American military personnel
Fictional American people in video games
Fictional assassins in video games
Fictional kickboxers
Fictional kyokushin kaikan practitioners
Fictional martial artists in video games
Fictional male martial artists
Fictional mass murderers
Fictional MCMAP practitioners
Fictional military personnel in video games
Fictional mixed martial artists
Fictional police detectives
Fictional police officers in video games
Fictional shotokan practitioners
Fictional United States Marine Corps personnel
Male characters in video games
Male video game villains
Namco antagonists
Tekken characters
Video game characters introduced in 1997
Video game characters who can move at superhuman speeds
Video game characters with superhuman strength
Zombie and revenant characters in video games